Tropidoscincus is a genus of skink. They are all endemic to New Caledonia.

Classification
Tropidoscincus aubrianus Bocage, 1873 – Aubrey's whiptailed skink
Tropidoscincus boreus Sadlier & Bauer, 2000 – northern whiptailed skink
Tropidoscincus variabilis  (Bavay, 1869) – southern whiptailed skink

Nota bene: A binomial authority in parentheses indicates that the species was originally described in a genus other than Tropidoscincus.

References

 
Lizard genera
Taxa named by José Vicente Barbosa du Bocage